Loudmouth(s) may refer to:

 Loudmouth (band), an American rock band
 Loudmouth (The Boomtown Rats album)
 Loudmouth (Jim Bianco album)
 The Loud Mouth, a 1932 short comedy film
 Loudmouth Golf, an American sportswear company
 Loudmouths, a New York sports-debate TV show
 "Loudmouth", a song by the Ramones from Ramones